Weightlifting at the Summer Paralympics was introduced at the 1964 Games. Starting with the 1984 Games, separate competitions were held in the sports of weightlifting and powerlifting. Weightlifting made its final appearance at the 1992 Games, after which only powerlifting competitions were held.

Summary

See also 
 Weightlifting at the Summer Olympics
 Powerlifting at the Summer Paralympics

References 

 
Sports at the Summer Paralympics